Duane Mac Simolke (born May 28, 1965) is an American writer based in Lubbock, Texas, who has authored The Acorn Stories, Degranon: A Science Fiction Adventure, Holding Me Together, The Return of Innocence (with Toni Davis), and New Readings of Winesburg, Ohio, based on the original Sherwood Anderson classic. He edited and co-wrote the spin-off The Acorn Gathering and donated the royalties of that work to the American Cancer Society. "Acorn" refers to a fictitious town somewhere in isolated west Texas.

Simolke (pronounced SMOKY) was born in New Orleans. His father was Frederick J. "Pete" Simolke (1938–2001). "Pete" had a twin brother, Carl Wayne Simolke (1938–2006) of Shreveport. Simolke's paternal grandparents were Frederick "Pappy" Simolke and the former Mattie Brown. Simolke grew up in Minden in Webster Parish in North Louisiana. He attended a Baptist Church and graduated from Minden High School in 1983.

Simolke thereafter procured three academic degrees in English. In 1989, he received his Bachelor of Arts from Belmont University in Nashville, Tennessee. He obtained his Master of Arts degree from Hardin-Simmons University, another Baptist-affiliated institution, in Abilene in Taylor County, in west Texas in 1991. He earned his PhD from Texas Tech University in Lubbock in 1996.

Simolke's works have been published in a variety of journals, including nightFire, Mesquite, Caprock Sun, Midwest Poetry Review, and International Journal on World Peace.

Simolke is openly gay. According to his website: "After a lifetime of denial, I finally began to accept my homosexuality — a process made even more difficult by my religious fundamentalist background and mindset. Numerous essays and poems rose from my inner conflicts. Much of that writing, along with some of my earlier works, would later become my book Holding Me Together. . . . All of my books reflect the reality of human diversity; if encountering gays or people of color bothers you, then you probably won't like most of my writing".

In 1997, Simolke founded the gay online newsletter "Rainbow Lubbock".

References

1965 births
Living people
American science fiction writers
American short story writers
People from Lubbock, Texas
Texas Tech University alumni
Novelists from Texas
Writers from Minden, Louisiana
Writers from New Orleans
Hardin–Simmons University alumni
Belmont University alumni
Minden High School (Minden, Louisiana) alumni
American LGBT novelists
American male novelists
American male short story writers
Novelists from Louisiana
21st-century LGBT people